Samir Sellimi (born 15 June 1970) is a Tunisian footballer. He played in 49 matches for the Tunisia national football team from 1988 to 1995. He was also named in Tunisia's squad for the 1994 African Cup of Nations tournament. After retiring he became a manager.

He is a brother of Adel Sellimi.

References

External links
 

1970 births
Living people
People from Tunis Governorate
Tunisian footballers
Club Africain players
Tunisia international footballers
1994 African Cup of Nations players
Association football midfielders
Tunisian football managers
Najran SC managers
Khaleej FC managers
US Ben Guerdane managers
AS Marsa managers
Saudi First Division League managers
Tunisian expatriate football managers
Expatriate football managers in Saudi Arabia
Tunisian expatriate sportspeople in Saudi Arabia